The Horn mansion (角宿, pinyin: Jiǎo Xiù) is one of the Twenty-eight mansions of the Chinese constellations.  It is one of the eastern mansions of the Azure Dragon.

Asterisms

Chinese constellations